"" (I have surrendered to God's heart and mind) is a Christian hymn with a text by Paul Gerhardt in twelve stanzas is sung to the melody of "". The theme of the hymn is faith in God and the submission to his will.

The hymn was written in 1647 and published that same year in Johann Crüger's hymnal Praxis Pietatis Melica.  Translated into English it has appeared in ten English hymnals.

Text 
Gerhardt wrote his poem in twelve stanzas in 1647 during the Thirty Years' War. The theme of the hymn is faith in God and the submission to his will. The first lines, "Ich hab in Gottes Herz und Sinn mein Herz und Sinn ergeben", translate to "I have surrendered to God's heart and mind my heart and mind." Every stanza has 10 lines, following the meter 8.7.8.7.4.4.7.4.4.7. 

The song was first published in 1647 in Johann Crüger's hymnal Praxis Pietatis Melica. in the 1656 edition of the hymnal, it was No. 328 in the chapter "Vom Christlichen Leben und Wandel" (Of Christian life and action), in the 1666 edition it came with the header "Christliche Ergebung in Gottes Willen" (Christian submission to God's will).

Melody and musical settings 
The hymn is sung to the melody of "". Johann Sebastian Bach composed a chorale cantata on the hymn, Ich hab in Gottes Herz und Sinn, BWV 92, in 1725 as part of his chorale cantata cycle. While Bach frequently used single stanzas from Gerhardt's hymns for his cantatas and Passions, this hymn is the only one on which he based a chorale cantata. Different from the format for these cantatas to retain only the text of the outer stanzas, Bach set the text of five of the twelve stanzas unchanged.

Translation 
"Ich hab in Gottes Herz und Sinn" was translated to several English-language versions and appeared in ten hymnals. J. Kelly translated the hymn in 1867, titled "Christian Devotion to God's Will", with the incipit "I into God's own heart and mind".

References

External links 
 Ich hab in Gottes Herz und Sinn Der Spiegel
 7 J.S. Bach chorale settings of Was mein Gott will, das gscheh allzeit, Zahn 7568 by Luke Dahn (retrieved 21 June 2017)

1647 works
17th-century hymns in German
Lutheran hymns
Hymns by Paul Gerhardt